NGC 906 is a barred spiral galaxy in the constellation Andromeda in the northern sky. It is estimated to be 215 million light years from the Milky Way and has a diameter of approximately 110,000 ly. NGC 906 was discovered on October 30, 1878 by astronomer Édouard Stephan.

See also 
 List of NGC objects (1–1000)

References

External links 
 

0906
Barred spiral galaxies
Andromeda (constellation)
009188